Wellington Nathaniel Crutchfield, III (born March 7, 1976) is a former American football cornerback in the National Football League for the Washington Redskins and the New York Jets.  He played college football at North Carolina Central University.

References

1976 births
Living people
Players of American football from Raleigh, North Carolina
American football cornerbacks
North Carolina Central Eagles football players
Washington Redskins players
New York Jets players